DNA cross-link repair 1B protein is a protein that in humans is encoded by the DCLRE1B gene.

DNA interstrand cross-links prevent strand separation, thereby physically blocking transcription, replication, and segregation of DNA. DCLRE1B is one of several evolutionarily conserved genes involved in repair of interstrand cross-links (Dronkert et al., 2000).[supplied by OMIM]

Function

The DCLRE1B/SNM1B/Apollo protein is a repair exonuclease that digests double-stranded and single-stranded DNA with a 5’ to 3’ directionality.

Using an SNM1B/Apollo knockout mouse model, evidence was obtained that SNM1B/Apollo protein is required to protect telomeres against illegitimate non-homologous end joining that can result in genomic instability and consequently in multi-organ developmental failure. 

In a human patient with Hoyeraal-Hreidarsson syndrome, a dominant negative mutation in the SNM1B/Apollo gene was discovered.  This mutation hampered the proper replication of telomeres, leading to major telomeric dysfunction and cellular senescence.  SNM1B/Apollo protein appears to be a crucial factor in telomere maintenance, independent of its function in repairing DNA inter-strand crosslinks.

References

Further reading